Cameron Joseph Gallagher (born December 6, 1992) is an American professional baseball catcher in the Cleveland Guardians organization. He has played in Major League Baseball (MLB) for the Kansas City Royals.

Professional career

Kansas City Royals
Gallagher was drafted by the Kansas City Royals in the second round of the 2011 MLB draft out of Manheim Township High School in Lancaster, Pennsylvania. The Royals added him to their 40-man roster after the 2016 season.

The Royals promoted Gallagher to the 25-man roster to replace the injured Salvador Pérez on August 6, 2017. He made his MLB debut the same day in the second game of a doubleheader against the Seattle Mariners, collecting his first MLB hit. He hit his first MLB home run on August 14, 2017 against the Oakland Athletics, a grand slam.

In 2018, Gallagher batted .206/.250/.302 for the Royals with 1 home run and 7 RBI in 63 at bats. Gallagher played in 45 contests in 2019, slashing .238/.312/.365 with career-highs in home runs (3) and RBI (12).

On July 11, 2020, it was announced that Gallagher had tested positive for COVID-19. Overall with the 2020 Kansas City Royals, Gallagher batted .283 with one home run and 3 RBIs in 25 games. In 2021, he batted .250/.298/.330 with one home run and 7 RBIs in 112 at bats.

San Diego Padres
On August 2, 2022, Gallagher was traded to the San Diego Padres in exchange for Brent Rooker. On September 9, Gallagher was designated for assignment.

Baltimore Orioles
On September 11, 2022, Gallagher was claimed off waivers by the Baltimore Orioles. On November 8, Gallagher elected free agency.

Cleveland Guardians
On January 4, 2023, Gallagher signed a minor league contract with the Cleveland Guardians. The deal includes an invitation to the Guardians' 2023 major league spring training camp.

References

External links

Cam Gallagher at Baseball Almanac

1992 births
Living people
Baseball players at the 2015 Pan American Games
Baseball players from Pennsylvania
Burlington Royals players
Gulf Coast Royals players
Idaho Falls Chukars players
Kansas City Royals players
Lexington Legends players
Major League Baseball catchers
Northwest Arkansas Naturals players
Omaha Storm Chasers players
Pan American Games medalists in baseball
Pan American Games silver medalists for the United States
Sportspeople from Lancaster, Pennsylvania
Surprise Saguaros players
United States national baseball team players
Wilmington Blue Rocks players
Medalists at the 2015 Pan American Games